Muhafiz or Mohafiz may refer to:

Mohafiz (vehicle), an internal security vehicle designed and manufactured at Heavy Industries Taxila (HIT) in Pakistan
PNS Muhafiz, a Pakistani minesweeper
In Custody (film), also known as Muhafiz
Muhafiz (1998), a Pakistani film
 Muḥāfiẓ, the head of a Muhafazah (administrative division) in many Arab countries